Fouquet (Foucquet) is a French surname. Notable people with the surname include:

 Bernard Foucquet, sculptor active in Sweden
 Charles Louis Auguste Fouquet, duc de Belle-Isle (1684–1761), French general and statesman
Christophe Fouquet (born 1974), French bobsledder
 Guillaume Fouquet de la Varenne (1560–1616), French chef and statesman
 Jean Fouquet (1420–1481), French painter
 Louis Charles Armand Fouquet (1693–1747), French general
 Nicolas Fouquet (1615–1680), French superintendent of Finances under Louis XIV of France
 Pierre-Claude Foucquet (1694–1772), French organist and harpsichordist
 Thierry Fouquet, the head of Opéra National de Bordeaux in 1996-2016

See also
Fouquet's, a Parisian restaurant

NOTE: Many immigrants to America anglicized their surname to either Fuqua or Fuquay upon arrival in America.

References

French-language surnames